Sar Gerik (also Romanized as Sar Gerīk and Sar Gerig) is a village in Binalud Rural District, in the Central District of Nishapur County, Razavi Khorasan Province, Iran. At the 2006 census, its population was 49, in 10 families.

References 

Populated places in Nishapur County